"Outta Nowhere" is a song by Cuban-American rapper Pitbull featuring Colombian-American recording artist Danny Mercer, taken from the former's seventh studio album Global Warming.
The song was released on May 28, 2013 by Mr. 305, Polo Grounds Music, and RCA Records as the second promotional single from the album. "Outta Nowhere" was written by Armando C. Perez, Danny Mercer while production was handled by Danny Mercer.

Music video
The music video was filmed in July 2013 by director Jessy Terrero, however, due to unknown reasons, Pitbull decided to cancel the upload of the music video.

Production
The song was initially recorded by Nicole Scherzinger, and a video of her recording the track can be found in her VH1 Behind the Music interview. The song was then turned over to Nick Wells, whom recorded his version with Danny Murk before being sent over to Pitbull for the final product.

Track listing and formats
 Digital download
 "Outta Nowhere"  – 3:26
 Promo CD
 "Timber"  – 3:24
 "Outta Nowhere"  – 3:26

Credits and personnel
Credits adapted from the single's official liner notes.

 Armando C. Perez – vocals, songwriter
 Danny Mercer – vocals, songwriter, record producer

Charts

Release history

References

External links
 

2012 songs
Pitbull (rapper) songs
Spanglish songs
Songs written by Pitbull (rapper)
RCA Records singles
Pop ballads
Rock ballads
Songs written by Danny Mercer
2013 singles
Music videos directed by Jessy Terrero